Carlos Hugo Garrido Chalén is a Peruvian poet award winner World Literature "Andres Bello" version poetry, 2009 in Venezuela, this poet has been declared living cultural Heritage of the Nation by the National Institute of Culture (INC) of the Peruvian republic. He studied journalism and law at the National University of Trujillo.  Garrido Chalén is one of the present representatives of the North Group that was born in Trujillo city in the first half of the twentieth century.

Biography
He was born in Zorritos district of the Tumbes Province, Peru on October 16, 1951. He studied upper in careers of laws (1970-1976) and journalism (1990-1995) at the National University of Trujillo. He was recognized in 1997 by the National Institute of Culture (INC), with the distinction "living cultural heritage of the nation.".

Work
Carlos Garrido Chalén has written poems, some of his work is:

CONFESIONES DE UN ÁRBOL
IDIOMA DE LOS ESPEJOS
LA OPULENCIA IGNORANTE
LA PALABRA SECRETA
LA VOZ DE LA VIOLENCIA
PUNTADA DE ZAPATERO
UN ANGEL EN EL EDÉN
LA SOMBRA DESCUBIERTA
NO SÉ LEER PERO ME ESCRIBEN
ITINERARIO DEL AMOR EN VALLEJO
LA NOCHE DEL COYOTE
LA MISIÓN DEL RELÁMPAGO
LOS ÁNGELES DEL VIENTO
LA MUERTE DEL GALLO SEGÚN SAN PEDRO
EN PIE DE GUERRA
EL MURO DEL ABISMO
LA GUERRA DEL ENGAÑO
EL REGRESO A LA TIERRA PROMETIDA
EL SOL NUNCA SE PONE EN MIS DOMINIOS
LA MONTAÑA DEL JURAMENTO

Awards
Winner of  the award World Literature "Andres Bello" poetry version, in 2009 in Venezuela. Ernesto Kahan, former vice president of the association IPPNW and personal of the Nobel Prize ceremony at IPPNW Peace in 1985, about Chalén Garrido said:"Poets of the stature of the Peruvian poet are like rare gems that appear in special periods of human history".

See also
North Group
National University of Trujillo
Trujillo

References

External links
Carlos Garrido Chalén

1951 births
Living people
Peruvian male poets
North Group (Trujillo)
National University of Trujillo alumni